Irina Borisovna Sokolovskaya (born 3 January 1983) is a Russian basketball player. She was part of the Russian national team that won the bronze medal at the 2008 Olympics. She plays for Dynamo Moscow in the Russian Premier League.

Her younger sister Olga is also a basketball player, and her father Boris is a national basketball coach.

Career
 2000–2003 Chevakata Vologda
 2003–2004 Dynamo Moscow
 2004–2007 Chevakata Vologda
 2007–2008 CSKA Moscow
 2009–2010 Chevakata Vologda
 2010–2011 Spartak Moscow Region
 2011 Chevakata Vologda
 2011– Dynamo Moscow

References 

Living people
Russian women's basketball players
Basketball players at the 2008 Summer Olympics
Olympic bronze medalists for Russia
Olympic basketball players of Russia
Olympic medalists in basketball
Medalists at the 2008 Summer Olympics
1983 births